Grand Champion International de Course is the second album by Québécois rock/pop band Les Trois Accords released in 2006 featuring the single, "Grand Champion". The single was available as a free single of the week on the iTunes Store in October 2006.

Track listing
 "Bing Bing" - 3:12
 "St-Cyrille-de-Wendover" - 2:45
 "Grand Champion" - 3:07
 "M'as Tu Dit?" - 1:53
 "Gratte-moi" - 2:34
 "Tout Nu sur La Plage" - 3:35
 "Jean" - 3:10
 "Ton Avion" - 2:44
 "Louis-Félix-Antoine" - 3:13
 "Pièce de Viande" - 2:37
 "Youri" - 3:12
 "Bac à Fleurs" - 3:13
 "Tu" - 3:06
 "Je T'ai Vu me Voir" - 3:01
 "Megaphotocopie" - 3:19

References 

Les Trois Accords albums
2006 albums
Indica Records albums